Lac de l'Aiguillette is a lake in Haute-Savoie, France.

Aiguillette